Solanum umtuma is a species of plant in the  Solanaceae family.

The species is related to tomatoes. The species is andromonoecous.

It can be found in South Africa in areas like Cape Province and KwaZulu-Natal.

References

umtuma